A Tale of the Forest Giant is a 1954 Soviet drama film directed by Alexander Zguridi.

Plot 
A group of children found a little moose and began to help him. Suddenly, one poacher kills the leader of a herd of moose, and then the main character, as a result, becomes the leader.

Cast
 Oleg Zhakov as Nikandr Petrovich Dudin
 Lyudmila Skopina as Varvara Mikhailovna Dudina
 Lev Sverdlin as Vladimir Vasilyevich
 Vladimir Dorofeyev as Uncle Yasha
 Vera Kondakova as Nadya
 Viktor Kulakov as Nazarka
 Ivan Kuznetsov as Ostap Andreyevich
 Sergey Morskoy as Valentin Nikolaevich Kruglov 
 Gena Rumyantsev as Egorushka
 Maria Yarotskaya as Granny

See also
 In the World of Animals

References

External links 
 
 Очерки истории советского кино
 A Tale of the Forest Giant on kino-teatr.ru

1954 films
Soviet drama films
1950s Russian-language films
Films about animals
Russian children's drama films
1954 drama films
1950s children's drama films
Soviet children's films